Louis Kronberg (1872–1965) was an American figure painter, art dealer, advisor, and teacher. Among his best-known works are Behind the Footlights (Pennsylvania Academy, Philadelphia) and The Pink Sash (Metropolitan Museum, New York).

Biography 
Kronberg was born in Boston on December 20, 1872. He studied at the Boston Museum School, under Edmund C. Tarbell and Frank Weston Benson, where he earned a Longfellow Traveling Scholarship. Kronberg also studied at the Art Students' League, New York, and at the Académie Julian (1894–1896) under Jean-Paul Laurens and Jean-Joseph Benjamin-Constant, and privately with Raphaël Collin.  In Paris, Kronberg became enamored with the works of Edgar Degas and proficiently painted ballet and Spanish dancers within theatre settings.

Establishing himself in Boston, Kronberg was appointed instructor in the portrait class of Boston's Copley Society of Art. Kronberg was vastly supported by Boston's great art matron Isabella Stewart Gardner, and hence his work is represented in the Isabella Stewart Gardner Museum, as well as in the museums of Boston and Indianapolis. After Bernard Berenson, Kronberg frequently went to Paris to buy art for the Gardner Museum. He lived in Boston until 1919, when he moved to New York City. From 1921–1922 he painted in Algiers and Spain. Later, he lived in Palm Beach, and throughout his career he traveled back and forth to Paris.

Kronberg was an Associate of the American Academy of Arts and Sciences (1935). He was known for his philanthropic efforts and financed painter Arthur Clifton Goodwin's career for over fifteen years.

He died in West Palm Beach, Florida on March 9, 1965.

Art style 
Although Kronberg is considered a "Tarbellite" because he trained with Tarbell and Benson, he was highly influenced by the French Impressionists and especially the pastels and oils of ballerinas painted by Degas. His work shows the influence of his French training — his compositions are good and his colors soft and harmonious, yet with decided contrasts. His best work was executed prior to 1915 before he became nearsighted.

Memberships 
 Boston Art Club
 The Guild of Boston Artists
 Salmagundi Club
 Lotos Club
 Salon des Beaux-Arts, Paris
 Copley Society of Art
 American Water Color Club
 New York Water Color Club
 Rockport Art Association

Awards
 Pan-Pacific Exposition in San Francisco (1915)
 Salmagundi Club (1919)
 International Exposition, Paris (1937)
 Chevalier Legion of Honor, France (1951)

Represented in permanent collections 
 Museum of Fine Arts, Boston
 Metropolitan Museum of Art
 Isabella Stewart Gardner Museum, Boston
 Butler Art Institute
 San Diego Museum of Art
 Albright–Knox Art Gallery, Buffalo, NY
 Joslyn Art Museum
 New York Historical Society
 Pennsylvania Academy of the Fine Arts, Philadelphia
 Art Institute of Chicago
 Indianapolis Museum of Art
 Luxembourg Museum (Paris, France)
 Société Nationale (Paris, France)
 Musée d'Orsay (Paris, France)
 La Petite Danseuse at the Zuckerman Museum of Art located at KSU, Marietta Campus

See also 
 Boston School

References 

 Pierce, Edmund C. Tarbell & the Boston School of Painting (1980)
 Mantle Fielding, Dictionary of American Painters... (1927)
 Falk, Who Was Who in American Art

External links 

Louis Kronberg exhibition catalogs

19th-century American painters
19th-century American male artists
American male painters
20th-century American painters
1872 births
1965 deaths
Artists from Boston
Chevaliers of the Légion d'honneur
20th-century American male artists